Holme Moss ( a.s.l.) is high moorland on the border between the Holme Valley district of Kirklees in West Yorkshire and the High Peak district of Derbyshire in England.  Historically on the boundary between the West Riding of Yorkshire and Cheshire, it is just inside the boundary of the Peak District National Park. The A6024 road between Holmfirth and Longdendale crosses the moor near its highest point close to Holme Moss transmitting station's prominent mast.

Watershed
Water seeping from the surrounding moorland into Rake Dike is the source of the River Holme. Rake Dike rising from Kay Edge on the moor flows through the village of Holme into Brownhill Reservoir, about a mile below the moor, and passes down through the Holme Valley to Huddersfield, where it flows into the River Colne. The upper part of the moor continues into Black Hill which is crossed by the Pennine Way north–south footpath.

Transmitting station 

Holme Moss transmitting station is the highest in England. When erected it transmitted television signals that travelled much further than its intended service area. They were received on the Isle of Man and in parts of the Irish Republic, mainly Dublin and Wicklow. Now it provides VHF coverage for FM and DAB to a wide area around the transmitter including Derbyshire, Greater Manchester and West Yorkshire. The FM signals operate at 250 kW from one of the most powerful transmitters in the country with reception available as far north as the Borders, as far south as Birmingham, and to the east and west coasts. Emley Moor (55.44°, 15.53 km) and Moorside Edge (348.22°, 11.56 km) transmitters can be seen from the location.

Transport
In the winter Holme Moss frequently gets a covering of snow and the road over the moor is often the first in the area to be blocked. Kirklees Highways department clears the road as far as the border with Derbyshire. Derbyshire County Council Highways Authority is responsible for clearing the southern side.

Sport

Athletics
Holmfirth Harriers Athletics Club organise an annual "Holme Moss Fell Race" on and around Holme Moss in the summer. The race starts at Cartworth Moor cricket ground, crosses Ramsden Clough to Holme Moss, crosses and descends to Crowden before returning via Bareholme Moss, Laddow Rocks and Black Hill.

Cycling

To British cycling enthusiasts, Holme Moss has become synonymous with the A6024 (Woodhead Road) which crosses the moor, between the village of Holmbridge to the north and the Woodhead Reservoir to the south. The northern side in particular is one of England's best known bicycle ascents, and has acquired a reputation as among the country's more difficult climbs. It has often been used for domestic competition in British road racing and mountain biking.

Climbs

"Le Col de Moss"
Although not comparable in distance with the cols of European bicycle racing, the length and difficulty of Holme Moss relative to other British climbs has made it a frequent and popular inclusion in British races, including the Tour of Britain. For many years the (now defunct) Leeds Classic race saw internationally renowned riders (many of them, such as Bjarne Riis, veterans of the Tour de France) tackling the climb.

Tour de France
The second stage of the 2014 Tour de France followed the route across the Pennines to Derbyshire. The leader over the summit was Blel Kadri from France.

References

Mountain passes of England
Holme Valley
Peak District
Climbs in cycle racing in the United Kingdom